Tejas is the fifth studio album by the American rock band ZZ Top. It was released in late November 1976, on the London label. The title is a Caddo language word meaning "friends", which is the origin of the name of the band's home state, Texas.

Background and release 

Frontman Billy Gibbons said about the album:

It's fair to say that this is a transitional record, although I'm not really sure what we were transitioning from and what we were becoming. (laughs) It may be representative of how rapidly things were changing in the studio.

The equipment was becoming more modernized, and the way that music was being recorded was different – things were moving faster. It was still pre-digital, but there was better gear that was more readily available. We made use of it all.

This period was the wrinkle that kind of suggested what was to come, and change would become a necessary part of the ZZ Top fabric.

Tejas was produced by Bill Ham and recorded and mixed by Terry Manning. In 1987, a digitally remixed version of the recording was released on CD and the original 1976 mix version was discontinued. The remix version created controversy among fans because it significantly changed the instrument balance and the sound of the instruments, especially the drums.

Tejas was released as a digital download on Amazon.com's MP3 store and iTunes in 2012, with the original mixes of the tracks that are included on Chrome, Smoke & BBQ, and the 1987 remixes of the tracks that are not from that boxset. The original mix of the album was released on CD in June 2013 as part of the box set The Complete Studio Albums (1970–1990).

Critical reception 

In a contemporaneous review of the album Richard Riegel of Creem called Tejas an album that "sings of those Southwestern lyrical staples... but with greater immediacy than the I'm-all-dressed-up-in-my-Roy-Rogers-cowboy-suit Eagles". He compared the album to that of Peter Frampton's Frampton Comes Alive!, but observes that Tejas might outsell Frampton.

Barry Cain of Record Mirror wrote in a review that Tejas was highlighted by the songs "Arrested For Driving While Blind" and "El Diablo". He states that "El Diablo" had "struck him as being about the most haunting song he ever come across". Cain also praised the vocals and guitar playing of Billy Gibbons on the album.

Track listing

Personnel 
ZZ Top
 Billy Gibbons – guitar, vocals, harmonica
 Dusty Hill – bass, vocals
 Frank Beard – drums, percussion

Additional personnel
 Lenny Solomon – violin

Production 
Producer – Bill Ham
Engineer – Terry Manning
Mastering – Larry Nix
Photography – Lee and Lesser
Album concept – Bill Ham
Album design – Bill Narum

Charts

Certifications

References

External links

ZZ Top albums
1976 albums
London Records albums
Albums produced by Bill Ham